Case of the Full Moon Murders (also known as The Case of the Smiling Stiffs) is a 1973 sexploitation comedy film directed by Sean S. Cunningham and Brud Talbot and starring Fred J. Lincoln, Harry Reems, and Sandra Peabody.

It features many of the same cast and crew as the 1972 horror film The Last House on the Left, though is wholly disparate in terms of its tone and content. It was advertised with the tagline "The First Sex-Rated Whodunit," reflecting the film's mix of softcore pornography and mystery film elements.

Plot
A killer who may be a vampire leaves her victims with smiles on their faces.

Cast
Todd McMillan 
Andrew Galloways

Filming locations
The movie was filmed in Miami, Florida.

See also
 List of American films of 1973

References

External links

1973 films
Films directed by Sean S. Cunningham
1970s comedy horror films
1973 horror films
American sexploitation films
American comedy horror films
1973 comedy films
1970s English-language films
1970s American films